George Groves may refer to:

George Groves (footballer) (1868–1941), English footballer, first-class cricket player, and sports journalist
George Groves (sound engineer) (1901–1976), American film sound pioneer
George Groves (boxer) (born 1988), English boxer
George Groves (American football) (1921–2011), American football guard